Asaphomyces is a genus of fungi in the family Laboulbeniaceae. The genus contain 4 species.

References

External links
Asaphomyces at Index Fungorum

Laboulbeniomycetes